Chau may refer to:

Chau, Hong Kong surname
Châu, a Vietnamese surname, including a list of people with the name
Zhou (surname), or Chau, a Chinese family name, including a list of people with the name
CHAU-DT, a French language television station in Canada
Chau (album), by Los Fabulosos Cadillacs, 2001
"Chau#", a 2015 song by Hey! Say! JUMP

See also

Zhou (disambiguation)
Chao (disambiguation)
Chhau dance, a semi-classical Indian dance
Ciao, an informal salutation in Italian